Voices in the Night is a 2003 Spanish-Italian film written and directed by  based on the 1963 novel Voices in the Evening by Natalia Ginzburg. Ruiz relocates the setting from an Italian village to a Spanish one, but keeps the setting in the 1950s. The main roles are played by Laia Marull, Tristán Ulloa, and Vicky Peña.

Cast

Production 
A Spanish-Italian co-production by DeAPlaneta, Esicma, and Mikado, the film also had the participation of Antena 3, Canal+, and TVC. Shooting locations included the province of Girona.

Release 
The film screened at the 48th Valladolid International Film Festival (Seminci) in October 2003. Distributed by Columbia TriStar, it was theatrically released in Spain on 27 February 2004.

Reception 
Jonathan Holland of Variety deemed the film to "a well-dressed, if over-earnest, romancer", "otherwise solidly built, well-played".

Nuria Vidal of Fotogramas rated the film 4 out of 5 stars, hightlighting the performance by Marull as the best thing about the film.

Casimiro Torreiro of El País deemed Voices in the Night to be a "glossy, evocative and rigorous provincial drama".

Accolades 

|-
| align = "center" | 2005 || 19th Goya Awards || Best Adapted Screenplay || Salvador García Ruiz ||  || 
|}

See also 
 List of Spanish films of 2004

References

Spanish historical drama films
Italian historical drama films
Films based on Italian novels
2003 films
2000s Spanish films
2000s Italian films
Films set in Spain
Films set in the 1950s
Films shot in the province of Girona